Mauricio Alejandro Molina Uribe (born 30 April 1980) is a retired Colombian football midfielder, who ended his professional career playing for Independiente Medellín.

Club career 
Molina started his career in Colombian side Envigado at the age of 16. He soon made his way up to the first team and was transferred to Independiente Santa Fé. around his stint through Santa Fe, After a serious injury he returned to the pitch in 2002 playing for Independiente Medellín where he led the team to its first national championship in 45 years and the third overall. In 2003, he helped the team reach the semi-finals of the Copa Libertadores. After the successful campaign with Independiente Medellín he moved to CA Morelia of Mexico until 2004. After Morelia, Molina went to the United Arab Emirates (UAE) to play for the Al Ain FC where he stayed for a semester, after which he returned to his best memories with Independiente Medellin for another semester. Molina then played for San Lorenzo de Almagro of Argentina from 2005 to 2006. In 2007, Molina signed with Paraguayan Club Olimpia de Asunción where he played the first semester of the year. After a very successful campaign with the team in which he was the co-scorer with 10 goals, Molina was transfer for the second semester of 2007 to the Serbian club FK Crvena Zvezda, also known as Red Star Belgrade, in which Molina makes his debut in the European football.

Molina prepares to include himself in the lines of a great club: Brazilian Santos. He made his debut as a Santos player on 13 February 2008, starting against Cúcuta Deportivo of Colombia in the 2008 Copa Libertadores.

In July 2009, Molina moves to South Korean club Seongnam Ilhwa Chunma for $1,275,000. In his first K-League match for Seongnam, he scored debut goal against Pohang Steelers. In all K-league competitions Molina scored 22 goals along with 11 assists in 50 appearances for Seongnam Ilhwa Chunma and in 2010 Molina and Seongnam Ilhwa Chunma won the AFC Champions League 2010.

On 24 January 2011, Molina signed for K League Classic side FC Seoul on a three-year contract.

On 31 December 2015, Molina returned to Independiente Medellín, where he played for two more seasons before finally retiring from professional football, tenure during which he acted as a co-captain for the team and helped them win the 2016 Torneo Apertura, his second with the club and their 6th league title overall.

International career 
At the national team level, he was part of the Colombia national football team that won the 2001 Copa América.

Career statistics

K League 
Correct .

International goals
Scores and results list Colombia's goal tally first.

Honours

Club
Independiente Medellin
Categoría Primera A (2): 2002-II, 2016-I

Seongnam Ilhwa Chunma
AFC Champions League (1): 2010

FC Seoul
K League (1): 2012
Korean FA Cup (1): 2015

International
Colombia
Copa América (1): 2001

Individual
FIFA Club World Cup Top Scorer : 2010 (3 goals)
K League Best XI : 2010, 2012
K League Top Assists Award : 2012, 2013

References

External links
Mao Molina Facebook
Mao Molina Fansite

Mauricio Molina at mediotiempo.com
Mauricio Molina at santos.globo.com 

1980 births
Living people
Association football midfielders
Colombian footballers
Colombian expatriate footballers
Colombia international footballers
Envigado F.C. players
Independiente Santa Fe footballers
Independiente Medellín footballers
Atlético Morelia players
Al Ain FC players
San Lorenzo de Almagro footballers
Club Olimpia footballers
Red Star Belgrade footballers
Santos FC players
Seongnam FC players
FC Seoul players
Categoría Primera A players
Serbian SuperLiga players
Argentine Primera División players
Liga MX players
K League 1 players
Expatriate footballers in the United Arab Emirates
Expatriate footballers in Argentina
Expatriate footballers in Paraguay
Expatriate footballers in Mexico
Expatriate footballers in Serbia
Expatriate footballers in Brazil
Expatriate footballers in South Korea
2001 Copa América players
2003 CONCACAF Gold Cup players
Colombian expatriates in South Korea
Copa América-winning players
Footballers from Medellín
UAE Pro League players